Kinstellar is an international law firm operating in Central and Eastern Europe, Turkey and Central Asia. It was formed in 2008 from the Bratislava, Bucharest, Budapest and Prague offices of Linklaters, and has since expanded into Bulgaria, Kazakhstan, Serbia, Turkey, Ukraine and Uzbekistan. The firm employs more than 250 lawyers, with a focus on business law in emerging markets.

History 
Kinstellar's Prague office, founded in 1992 as a joint venture of member firms of the Alliance of European Lawyers, became part of Linklaters & Alliance in 1999. The Bucharest and Bratislava practices were established in 1993 and operated as Burns Schwartz, a regional Central European law firm, until January 2000 when they merged with Linklaters. The Budapest office was established by Linklaters in 2000. In November 2008, the four CEE offices became a separate practice again, as they were spun off into a regional independent firm under the name Kinstellar (an anagram of Linklaters). Kinstellar opened offices in Belgrade and Istanbul in 2010, and in Almaty in 2013, integrating a team from Dentons. In November 2014 it opened its eighth office in Sofia, Bulgaria. A ninth office, in Kyiv, Ukraine, was launched in 2016. The newest office, in Tashkent, Uzbekistan, was launched in March 2018.

Offices 
 Almaty, Kazakhstan
 Belgrade, Serbia
 Bratislava, Slovakia
 Bucharest, Romania
 Budapest, Hungary
 Istanbul, Turkey
 Kyiv, Ukraine
 Prague, Czech Republic
 Sofia, Bulgaria
 Tashkent, Uzbekistan

References 

Law firms with offices in foreign countries
Law firms established in 2008
http://www.kinstellar.com/news-and-deals/news/detail/706/kinstellar-launches-office-in-tashkent-uzbekistan
http://www.kinstellar.com/news-and-deals/news/detail/703/kinstellar-wins-law-firm-of-the-year-in-central-europe-at-the-lawyer-european-awards-2018